Trimble Inc. is an American software, hardware, and services technology company. Trimble supports global industries in building & construction, agriculture, geospatial, natural resources and utilities, governments, transportation and others. Trimble also does hardware development of global navigation satellite system (GNSS) receivers, scanners, laser rangefinders, unmanned aerial vehicles (UAVs), inertial navigation systems and software processing tools.

History
Trimble Navigation was founded in November 1978 by Charles Trimble and two partners from Hewlett Packard. It initially operated above a movie theatre in Los Altos, California.

By the end of 2016, the company had 8,388 employees, with more than half of employees in locations outside the United States.

The company's acquisitions include Telog Instruments, Pocket Mobile AB, @Road, Cengea Solutions Inc., Datacom Software Research, Spectra Precision Group, Tripod Data Systems, Advanced Public Safety, Inc., ALK Technologies, Apache Technologies, Acutest Engineering Solutions Ltd, Applanix, Géo-3D, INPHO, Gatewing, Gehry Technologies, MENSI, Meridian Systems, NTech Industries, Pacific Crest, Quantm, Accubid Systems, SketchUp, QuickPen International, SECO Mfg. Co., Inc., Visual Statement, Stabiplan, XYZ Solutions, Inc, Tekla, Vianova Systems, ThingMagic, Spime Inc., Punch Telematix NV, TMW Systems, Kuebix, and TopoSys Gmbh.

In 2002, Caterpillar and Trimble formed a joint venture Caterpillar Trimble Control Technologies (CTCT), to develop machine control products for improved customer productivity and lower costs on earthmoving projects.

Their role in building information modeling (BIM), architecture and construction has been growing. Trimble acquired the 3D modeling software package SketchUp from Google in 2012.

As of 2014, they also own Tekla (BIM modelling), Vico Office (BIM data handling) and Gehry Technologies' GTeam (project coordination).

In 2016, Trimble acquired Sefaira (sustainability analysis software including energy modeling and daylight visualization).

On April 23, 2018, Trimble entered into an agreement to acquire privately held Viewpoint from investment firm Bain Capital in an all-cash transaction of US$1.2bn, with an expected completion in Q3 of 2018.

On February 12, 2019, a new division called Trimble MAPS (Maps and Applications for Professional Solutions) was launched, bringing together Trimble's former ALK Technologies and TMW Appian Final Mile businesses.

On October 3, 2019, Trimble acquired Cityworks to expand its GIS-centric digital asset and infrastructure management solutions.

On October 30, 2019, Trimble announced that its board of directors has unanimously elected Robert G. Painter to succeed Steven W. Berglund as president and CEO of Trimble, effective January 4, 2020, the first day of Trimble's 2020 fiscal year. Painter joined the Trimble Board of Directors on January 4, 2020 as well.

On May 28, 2020, Trimble and  Kuebix launched next-generation Community Load Match capabilities to simplify finding and filling truckload capacity. A solution that facilitates collaboration between shippers and carriers to optimize how freight moves throughout the supply chain.

On October 6, 2022, Trimble announced its headquarters had relocated to Westminster, Colorado from Sunnyvale, California.

Name change
The company changed its name from Trimble Navigation Limited to Trimble Inc.; the name change and change in legal domicile became effective October 1, 2016. Trimble Inc. continued to operate without change or material impacts to stakeholders. The corporate headquarters remained in California until October 2022, when it relocated to Westminster, Colorado.

Industries
Trimble sells products and services into the following industries: land survey, construction, agriculture, transportation, telecommunications, asset tracking, mapping, railways, utilities, mobile resource management, and government.

References

External links 

1978 establishments in California
Companies based in Sunnyvale, California
Companies listed on the Nasdaq
Electronics companies established in 1978
Geographic data and information equipment companies
Navigation system companies
Radio-frequency identification companies